Jangalabad (also Romanized as Jangalābād; also known as Jangalābād-e Bālā) is a village in Esmaili Rural District, Esmaili District, Anbarabad County, Kerman Province, Iran. At the 2006 census, its population was 147, in 28 families.

References 

Populated places in Anbarabad County